Cocteau Twins were a Scottish gothic rock and dream pop group whose discography contains nine studio albums, seven compilations, and numerous EPs and singles. The band have had several UK top 40 albums, with four of their studio albums also reaching the Billboard 200 albums chart in the United States.

Commercially, their most successful studio album, Heaven or Las Vegas was released in 1990 and reached number seven in the United Kingdom and number ninety-nine in the United States. Heaven or Las Vegas was certified Silver by the British Phonographic Industry. It eventually sold 235,000 copies by 1996, according to Billboard. The album was included in the book 1001 Albums You Must Hear Before You Die, and was voted number 218 in the third edition of Colin Larkin's All Time Top 1000 Albums. In 2020, Rolling Stone listed it at No. 245 in its list of the 500 Greatest Albums of All Time. The band have had four of their studio albums reach number one on the UK Indie Chart.

The band have had six of their singles chart within the top 100 in the United Kingdom, with three of their singles charting within the top 10 of the US Alternative Songs Chart. Their 1984 single "Pearly-Dewdrops' Drops" reached number one on the UK Indie Chart.

In 1986, they released a collaboration album The Moon and the Melodies with Harold Budd. Over the course of their musical career, the Cocteau Twins have released several compilation albums.

Albums

Studio albums

Collaborative albums

Compilation albums

Extended plays

Singles

Notes

Music videos

References

Discographies of British artists
Rock music group discographies